King of the Beach may refer to:

 King of the Beach (Chris Rea album), 2000
 King of the Beach (Wavves album), 2010